Čengić is a South Slavic (predominantly  Bosniak) surname. It was the name of an affluent Ottoman Bosnian Čengić family. It may refer to:

 Bahrudin Čengić (1931–2007), Bosnian filmmaker known for Silent Gunpowder
 Ferid Čengić (1910–1986), Mayor of Sarajevo 1947–48
 Goran Čengić (1946–1992), Yugoslav handball player
 Hasan Čengić (1957–2021), Bosniak politician
 Muhamed Čengić (1942–2020), Bosniak politician
 Smail Agha Čengić (1788–1840), Ottoman nobleman
 Zulfikar Pasha Čengić (died 1846), Ottoman nobleman

See also 

 Čengić, place name
 Čengići, place name
 Čengić Vila, neighbourhood in Sarajevo

Bosnian surnames